HD Mining International is a mining company based in Vancouver, British Columbia, Canada. It is involved in the Murray River Project, a longwall coal mine in Peace River Country near Tumbler Ridge, British Columbia.

HD Mining was registered as BC enterprise in 2011 and based out of Vancouver. HD is owned by Chinese-based Huiyong Holdings Group's Huiyong Holdings BC, Canadian Dehua Lvliang Limited and a third undisclosed shareholder.

Most of current HD workforce are temporary foreign workers from China, mostly working in the Murray River mine, which has led to a controversy over hiring overseas workers instead of Canadian workers. HD Mining has indicated that TFW were hired to assess the site and that future employment for mining operations will shift to Canadians.

Organization

Very little is publicly known of the corporate structure of HD Mining nor the partners of the firm. HD Mining's current headed by Chair Penggui Yan Other known personnel include Jody Shimkus, Vice-President and former associate minister of mines of British Columbia and Ye Qing, corporate consultant.

Accomplishment 
Murray River Project

On March 15, 2012, the Government of British Columbia issued a bulk sample permit for work on Tract 1. Surface work will commence later in 2012 when conditions are suitable. The 160 square kilometer Murray River Project is located in the southwestern part of Tumbler Ridge, British Columbia and is part of the traditional territory of the First Nations who are members of the Treaty 8 Tribal Council. The project targets deep metallurgical coal seams between 400 and 800 metres with estimated reserves in excess of 3.18 billion tonnes. Initial mine development will be focused on the 37 square kilometer Parcel 1, which contains 688 million tonnes of proven mineral deposits.

References

External links

Coal companies of Canada
Companies based in Vancouver
Energy companies established in 2011
Non-renewable resource companies established in 2011